XHSMR-FM, also known as Trión, is a radio station on 90.1 FM located in the city of San Luis Potosí, San Luis Potosí, Mexico.

History

XESMR-AM received its concession on October 1, 1986. It was owned by Adrian Loreto Pereda López of Radiorama and broadcast with 1,000 watts. XESMR was sold to Radio Fórmula in 1989, and the concession was transferred a decade later.

In late 2010, XHSMR-FM 90.1 came to air. The AM-FM transition was completed when XESMR ceased broadcasting in April 2014.

In April 2017, XHSMR flipped to the Trión alternative rock format from RF, maintaining RF's national news programs.

External links
 Live Audio
 FCC information for XESMR

References

Radio stations in San Luis Potosí
Radio stations established in 1986
Mass media in San Luis Potosí City
1986 establishments in Mexico
Radio Fórmula